Usgentia is a genus of moths of the family Crambidae.

Species
Usgentia quadridentale (Zerny, 1914)
Usgentia vespertalis (Herrich-Schäffer, 1851)

References

Natural History Museum Lepidoptera genus database

Odontiinae
Crambidae genera
Taxa named by Hans Georg Amsel